Shaba II was a brief conflict fought in the Zairean province of Shaba (now Katanga) in 1978. The conflict broke out on 11 May 1978 after 6,500 rebels from the Congolese National Liberation Front (FNLC), a Katangese separatist militia, crossed the border from Angola into Zaire in an attempt to achieve the province's secession from the Zairian regime of Mobutu Sese Seko. The FNLC captured the important mining town of Kolwezi.

Foreign involvement
The Mobutist government appealed for foreign assistance and French and Belgian military intervention beat back the invasion, just as in 1977.

The US and Cuba coerced Angola and Zaire into negotiations leading to a non-aggression pact. That ended support for insurgencies in each other's countries. Zaire temporarily cut off support to the Front for the Liberation of the Enclave of Cabinda (FLEC), the National Liberation Front of Angola (FNLA) and the National Union for the Total Independence of Angola (UNITA), and Angola forbade further activity by the Shaba separatists.

The US worked with France in repelling the invaders in the first military co-operation between the two since the Vietnam War. U.S. Air Force elements involved included a Combat Control Team (air traffic controllers) of the 435th Tactical Airlift Wing, the 445th Airlift Wing, and other airlift wings.

Battle of Kolwezi

The French Foreign Legion's 2 Foreign Paratroop Regiment had 600 troops, who took back Kolwezi after a seven-day battle and airlifted 2,250 European citizens to Belgium but not before the FNLC had massacred 80 Europeans and 200 Africans. In one instance, the FNLC killed 34 European civilians who had hidden in a room. However, Zairean helicopter pilot Pierre Yambuya claims that many of the civilian deaths were caused by Zairian armed forces, not the FLNC.

Conclusion
The FNLC retreated to Zambia and back to Angola, vowing to return. The Zairian armed forces (Forces Armées Zaïroises) forcibly evicted civilians along Shaba's  border with Angola, and Mobutu ordered them to shoot on sight.

See also
Angolan Civil War
Cuban intervention in Angola
Shaba I

References

External links

Shaba II: The French and Belgian Intervention in Zaire in 1978

Cold War in Africa
1978 in Angola
History of the Democratic Republic of the Congo
Wars involving Belgium
Wars involving France
Wars involving the Democratic Republic of the Congo
Zaire
Conflicts in 1978
1978 in Zaire
Proxy wars